The Folch Collection was known during the period 1960-1980 as one of the best private mineral collections in the world. It was famous for its size (over 15,000 specimens), the quality of the pieces, the large number of classic specimens, which are now almost impossible to obtain, and the style of the collection, which is surprisingly 'modern'. Mr. Joaquín Folch i Girona collected during a period when the style of most mineral collectors in Europe consisted of gathering large specimens of rare minerals, and in which esthetics and perfection were not that important. 

He actually tended to collect smaller specimens that were esthetic, and, where possible, damage free. On the death of Sr. Folch, in 1984, the collection passed to his son Alberto, and when he in turn died to his grandson Joaquín Folch who wisely decided to keep the collection exactly as his grandfather had it (including the display cases). So the collection was kept together and its great historical value has not been lost. 

In 2005, the Folch family had the idea of updating the collection so as to include more modern material. Since 1984, nothing new had been added and a significant gap of the minerals found since then has developed.

Bibliography References
Burchard, U. y Bode, R. (1980). Mineral Museums of Europe. Walnut Hill Publ. Lalling. 269 p.

See also
Expominer

External links 
The Joaquín Folch Girona Mineral Collection, 2009 article from Rocks and Minerals magazine.
Images of mineral specimens from the Folch Collection.

This article includes material from Fabreminerals.com, which allowed through a permission to add content and publish them under GFDL.

Private collections in Spain
Mineralogy